WJJZ may refer to:

 WJJZ (FM), a radio station (94.5 FM) licensed to serve Irasburg, Vermont, United States
 WQJQ, a defunct radio station (100.3 FM) formerly licensed to serve Barton, Vermont, which held the call sign WJJZ from 2011 to 2012
 WPEN (FM), a radio station (97.5 FM) licensed to serve Burlington, New Jersey, United States, which held the call sign WJJZ from 2006 to 2008
 WUMR (FM), a radio station (106.1 FM) licensed to Philadelphia, Pennsylvania, United States, which held the call sign WJJZ from 1993 to 2006
 WJJZ (AM), the call sign of two former radio stations (1460 AM) licensed to serve Mount Holly, New Jersey, United States, between 1963 and 1983